Kammavari Sangha Institute of Technology (KSIT) is a private engineering college in Bangalore, Karnataka, It was founded by C.G Chinnappa Naidu, a civil contractor in Bangalore. He started the educational institution in order to allow the students from other communities to achieve their dreams.  It is affiliated to the Visvesvaraya Technological University, Belgaum. It was established in 1999.

References

Engineering colleges in Bangalore